The Trylon and Perisphere were two monumental modernistic structures designed by architects Wallace Harrison and J. Andre Fouilhoux that were together known as the Theme Center of the 1939 New York World's Fair. The Perisphere was a tremendous sphere,  in diameter, connected to the  spire-shaped Trylon by what was at the time the world's longest escalator. The Perisphere housed a diorama by Henry Dreyfuss called Democracity which, in keeping with the fair's theme "The World of Tomorrow", depicted a utopian city-of-the-future. The interior display was viewed from above on a moving sidewalk, while a multi-image slide presentation was projected on the dome of the sphere. After exiting the Perisphere, visitors descended to ground level on the third element of the Theme Center, the Helicline, a  spiral ramp that partially encircled the Perisphere.

The name "Perisphere" was coined using the Greek prefix peri-, meaning "all around", "about", or "enclosing". The name "Trylon" was coined from the phrase "triangular pylon".

Construction

The Theme Center was designed by architects Wallace Harrison and J. Andre Fouilhoux, with the interior exhibit by Henry Dreyfuss.  The structures were built in Flushing Meadows Park in Queens, New York and were intended as temporary with steel framing and plaster board facades. Both buildings were subsequently razed and scrapped after the closing of the fair, their materials to be used in World War II armaments.

Legacy

The Trylon and Perisphere became the central symbol of the 1939 World's Fair, its image reproduced by the millions on a wide range of promotional materials and serving as the fairground's focal point.  The United States issued a postage stamp in 1939 depicting the Trylon and Perisphere (pictured).  Neither structure survives; however, the Unisphere, the symbol of the 1964–65 New York World's Fair, is now located where the Perisphere once stood.

In culture

 In 1939, all three of New York City's major league baseball teams wore a patch on their uniform sleeve depicting the Trylon and Perisphere.
 Composer (and Rhapsody in Blue orchestrator) Ferde Grofé was commissioned by the World's Fair to compose a piece of symphonic music dedicated to the sculptured edifices.
 The New Yorker published a George Price cartoon in which two men dressed as the Trylon and Perisphere approach the World's Fair office, one saying, "If this doesn't get us in, nothing will."
 The Trylon is mentioned in the 1939 Yip Harburg song "Lydia the Tattooed Lady", made famous by Groucho Marx in At The Circus.
 The Trylon Theatre, located on Queens Boulevard in Forest Hills, Queens, operated from December 1939 through December 1999.  The theatre's decor included several references to the 1939–40 World's Fair.
 In the 1941 movie Mr. & Mrs. Smith the characters go to the fair. The actual structures are showcased with long camera shot, and are clearly visible while the characters are stuck on an amusement ride.
 The episode "The Odyssey of Flight 33" of The Twilight Zone featured a view of these structures from the air to indicate that a Boeing 707 had time traveled and had arrived in the year 1939 or 1940.
 In the DC Comics comic book series All-Star Squadron (debuting in 1981 but set during World War II), the Squadron used the Perisphere as their headquarters.
 In the DC Comics comic book series Young All-Stars (debuting in 1987 but also set in World War II), used the Trylon and Perisphere as their headquarters.
 Howard Waldrop's 1985 short story "Heirs of the Perisphere" describes the excavation of the time capsule which was buried at the 1939 World's Fair.
 Singer/songwriter Aimee Mann created a song called "Fifty Years After the Fair" for her 1993 album Whatever, the subject of which is the 1939 World's Fair. The song references the Trylon and Perisphere while suggesting how little of the Fair's bright vision of the future had actually been realized in the "decades ahead" now passed.
 In the 1995 episode "Aubrey" of the TV series The X-Files, the protagonist has visions of Trylon and Perisphere leading the detectives to an important clue.
 The second episode of the fourth season of the Showtime series Homeland is titled "Trylon and Perisphere".
 The 2000 self-titled album Deltron 3030 featured an image of the Perisphere on its cover.
 A chapter in Michael Chabon's 2000 novel The Amazing Adventures of Kavalier & Clay, set in 1942, takes place inside the recently abandoned Perisphere.
 In author E. L. Doctorow's semi-autobiographical novel World's Fair, Doctorow tells the story of a boy named Edgar in the late 1930s who lives in the Bronx, which culminates with the 1939 World's Fair. The Trylon and Perisphere are referenced throughout the story.
 In Kenneth Robeson's 1939 Doc Savage novel World's Fair Goblin, the Trylon and Perisphere are depicted on the cover and integral to the story.
 In Rex Stout's 1940 Nero Wolfe novel Where There's a Will, one character says she had "an inferiority complex about the size of the Perisphere" (chapter 8); Archie Goodwin later suggests to a police officer that he "go sit on a trylon" (chapter 13).
 The 2015 utopian/dystopian film Tomorrowland contains futuristic versions of the Trylon, Perisphere, and Helicline. The Perisphere, in contrast to the 1939 World of Tomorrow exhibit, contains a device that can see into the past; the past is viewed on the sphere's inner surface. Also, unlike the 1939 Perisphere, the future Perisphere floats in mid-air. In the opening of the film, the Disneyland image is altered to include the trio.  They also appear in the closing animation.
 The 2017 short story "The Past is Important to Us" by Tom Hanks in his collection Uncommon Type is predominately set in New York City during the 1939 World's Fair and mentions the Trylon and Perisphere among other sights.
 The Batman movie Mask of the Phantasm depicts Bruce Wayne and his girlfriend Andrea Beaumont visiting the Gotham World's Fair. Although not set in 1939, it hearkens back to that World's Fair because this is Batman's origin story and he first appeared in 1939. Thus, the Gotham World's Fair also has structures similar to the Perisphere and Trylon and displays depicting the future.
 The Trylon and Perisphere are referred to in the Shirley Jackson short story Paranoia.

See also
 Skylon (tower) at the 1951 Festival of Britain
 Unisphere at the 1964 New York World's Fair

References

Further reading
 Cohen, Barbara. Trylon and Perisphere. Harry N. Abrams, Inc. Publishers, New York, 1989.
 Gelernter, David. 1939: The Lost World of the Fair. The Free Press, New York, 1995.
 Newhouse, Victoria. Wallace K. Harrison, Architect. Rizzoli International Publications Inc. New York, 1989.
 "New York World's Fair, 1939." Architectural Forum, June 1939. vol. 70, pp. 393–462.
 "The World's Fair will put on a 6-minute show inside its perisphere." Life, August 1938. pp. 55–58.
 "Aerodynamics of the Perisphere and Trylon at World's Fair." American Society of Civil Engineers, Vol. 65 Issue 5, 1938. pp. 887–906.

External links

 1939–40 World's Fair Democracity Recreation (New York Public Library)
 Site offering a tour of the entire fairgrounds 

World's fair architecture in New York City
1939 New York World's Fair
Modernist architecture in New York City
Demolished buildings and structures in Queens, New York
Domes